John Archbold may refer to:

John Dustin Archbold (1848–1916), American capitalist and oil refiner
John Frederick Archbold (1785–1870), legal writer
John Dana Archbold (1910–1993), agriculturalist, sportsman, philanthropist, engineer and conservationist; grandson of John Dustin Archbold